The Broken Eye is a 2014 epic fantasy novel by New York Times Bestselling author, Brent Weeks. It is the third book in his Lightbringer series following The Black Prism and The Blinding Knife. The novel is written in the third person perspective, shifting between several characters, and further builds the world of the Lightbringer.

Plot

The novel "The Broken Eye" begins with a sea demon attack on the Chromeria, which a black sperm whale defends and rescues the city from at the last moment. Sperm whales had not been seen since the closing of the Everdark Gates. This event appears to be allegorical in nature, albeit with the moral obscured.

Karris Guile (née White Oak) returns to the Chromeria with the rest of the Blackguard from Ru, whereupon the White strips her of her position for marrying the Prism and insists that Karris can no longer draft since she is close to breaking her halo (when a drafter uses too much magic, the luxin residue breaks through their irises, and they become a Wight). She then puts Karris in charge of managing the Chromeria's spies.

Upon her return to the Jaspers, Teia is aggressively recruited by Joris Nograd, a representative for the Order of the Broken Eye , a group of assassins with their roots in ancient, forbidden magics, who are particularly interested in paryl drafters. Teia reports to Commander Ironfist, leader of the Blackguard, who takes her to see the White. She encourages Teia to continue working with them as a double agent, buying her loyalty by ensuring the economic security of her family.

Kip quickly evades Zymun and continues back to the Chromeria alone. As he makes his way through the jungle, he receives a religious vision and appears to commune with multiple spiritual entities. Upon his return to the Chromeria, he announces to the Spectrum that the Prism is alive on Gunner's pirate ship.

The (former) Prism spends the first third of the novel chained to an oar as a galley slave. He is completely color blind and can no longer draft after being unpacked on the Blinding Knife. He spends much of this time reflecting on the choices that brought him here, as well as sparring with his oar-mate Orholam about religion, so-called because he says nice things but, does nothing to rescue the slaves just like Orholam, the god. But perhaps he is a prophet of the real Orholam.

Liv is sent on an expedition to the Everdark Gates to locate the superviolet seed crystal. Seed crystals, along with bane, can be used by drafters to allow themselves to become inhabited by their color God. The extent of influence they each have on the other's behavior is unclear, although we do know from an earlier card scene that the otherworldly representative for that God must also be selected from amongst the 200 followers of Orholam, referred to collectively as djinn. It is then revealed that the black jeweled pendant found on the last two bane occupants is, in fact, black luxin, which has been described as 'soul poison,' the living embodiment of evil, and similar. Koios has researched it and believed he can control it, and control the "gods" with it. A woman claiming to represent the order of the Broken Eye warns Liv against the use of it at all costs.

The prophet Orholam promises Gavin a series of disturbing dreams. Soon after that, he dreams of his first Freeing. The ceremony took place soon after the battle at Sundered Rock, so the Freeing class consisted of over 400 drafters, many of them seasoned warriors. The ceremony lasted forty hours straight and included multiple assassination attempts. A sixteen-year-old drafter gifts her final five minutes to the Prism, where he breaks down from the burden of Freeing. This pointless act of selflessness breaks the Prism's faith in Orholam, and at the conclusion of the ceremony, he drafts black luxin.

Andross attempts to coerce the sub red spectrum color to back his bid to become Promachos and uses a Broken Eye assassin to do it. When this fails, she is assassinated, and Andross becomes Promachos anyway. He orders Kip to retrieve Janus Borrig's card set (as well as cards stolen from him by the Prism) in exchange for declaring Kip prism elect.

During a card scene, Koios tests his control of black by elevating an opportunistic blue to become Mott. As soon as he attempts betrayal, the pendant decapitates him. The Color Prince then selects Samila Sayeh for the 'honor,' which she does not want but is in no position to refuse.

Teia attends a recruitment meeting for the order, wherein the history of the world is explained. In their origin story, each color God or goddess controlled their own nations which were at endless war with one another. A race called the Braxians believed light to be a tool, not a thing of worship and were often caught up in the wars between color Gods due to no fault of their own. To defend themselves, they amassed 14 shimmercloaks and gave them to Paryl drafters, establishing the order of the Broken Eye. These advantages allowed them to police the world, most of whom believed the use of multiple colors to be blasphemous. Diakoptes, a member of their order, began experimenting with black luxin. It corrupted him, and he formed his own following and armed them with the knowledge of how to make drafters' spectacles, possessed only by the Braxians until that time. With this he remade himself as Lucidonius, and established a new world order beneath Orholam, using Prisms to balance the magical tides of the world. Thus, the order could no longer operate as it had. Before fading into shadow, however, they slew Diakoptes, in the hope that he would later be reborn and lead them back to the light.

Liv finally reunites with her father Corvan, who gives her a knife with which to defend herself. Liv is nonplussed at this, given she already has quite a few ways to defend herself but accepts regardless.

The Prism attempts to escape but is captured almost immediately by Eirene Malargos, who is unsure what to do with him. After losing two of his fingers from torture, he is eventually confronted by Ironfist's sister, the Nuqaba. She reveals the orange seed crystal, which can be used to read emotions. This forces the Prism to be fully honest. She wishes to convince Eirene to join her and defect to the Color Prince, which would effectively surrender Ruthgar and Paria to him, as a bid to buy time to build up a power base. She also mentions the gun-sword as an ancient religious relic, which the Prism had entrusted to one of the galley slaves before making his ill-chosen escape.

The Order teaches Teia how to make use of her color: in addition to the aforementioned uses, Paryl also can form a gas. Paryl drafters encase themselves in a bubble of it, to obscure themselves from vision. In the past, they were known as mystwalkers. It also turns out that lightsplitting, the ability to split sunlight into draftable colors, is significantly more common amongst Paryl drafters. (one in ten versus one in thousands) Though she is red-green colorblind, Teia nonetheless passes a lightsplitting test of the ability to 'feel' colors through the skin.

Kip eventually finds Janus's cards, but when he does, they immediately attach themselves to his skin all at once. The mental trauma of receiving so much input stops his heart.

Kip then has an out of body experience "outside" of time in "the Great Library." He converses with an otherworldly being calling himself Abaddon. While proclaiming himself to be Lightbringer, he also calls Kip Diakoptes. Kip is then forced to view all of the cards, which have taken the form of tattoos on his skin. The process creates duplicate cards which Abaddon captures in his cloak of human skin. Kip steals the cloak, and when Abaddon attempts to retaliate he is expelled from the library.

Kip falls unconscious and is resuscitated by Teia. When he comes to, all the cards are completely blank, drained of their magical properties - and Kip has a mistwalker's cloak. Teia explains to Kip that she has been spying on the order for the White, and Kip gives the cloak to Teia.

The Nuqaba tries to shoot the Prism but the bullet ricochets and hits her instead. Eventually, they decide to burn out his eyes and send him back to his father but have him assassinated along the way.

Andross instructs Kip to accept Tisis Malargos's marriage offer, both so he can spy for Andross and to get him off the Jaspers before any more assassination attempts can come. Kip explains to Andross about the cards and experienced several visions from them while doing so. In one of these, it is revealed that black luxin was Dazen's color.

While the blinding ceremony proceeds, the Prism considers drafting black to save himself. He ultimately rejects this, however, and is saved at the very last moment by Karris and Ironfist, but not before one of his eyes is burned out. They attempt to return him to the Chromeria.

Teia follows Andross after he leaves Kip's room. Using the cloak to make herself invisible, she discovers that Andross has contracted the Broken Eye to kill the White. As Kip and Tisis are finalizing their marriage preparations, Teia gathers him and the rest of their blackguard squad. They reach the White's rooms, but too late to save her. They are then summoned to the council chambers by Andross.

Andross kicks them off the island in order to give Kip a pretext to leave. Ironfist attempts to intervene, and is stripped of his position as Blackguard commander.

Liv reaches the Everdark Gates and locates the superviolet seed crystal. As she approaches, her bodyguard strips her of her weapons and informs her that she must wear the pendant or be thrown off a cliff. Liv instead stabs him with the knife Corvan gave her and takes the crystal for herself.

Zymun returns to the Chromeria and is made Prism Elect, though with severe misgivings from Andross. He then instructs the Chromeria soldiers to kill Kip and his former Blackguard squad. While the council is in session, no one can interrupt them, so this order goes unchallenged. The result is a small-scale war throughout the Jaspers which results in massive property damage, the destruction of the Cannon Island gun battery and hundreds of deaths, including Ironfist's brother Tremblefist.

Ironfist goes to check on the Prism, who is gone. 
Andross' slave Grinwoody appears - Ironfist is revealed to have sworn an oath to the Order of the Broken Eye and delivers the black seed crystal from the White's room to Grinwoody who is revealed to be the leader of the order and Ironfist’s uncle.

He reveals to Ironfist that the blackguard's true purpose is to guard the black seed crystal, which is kept by the Chromeria. Ironfist has, unwittingly, delivered it into the hands of the Order. Ironfist tells him that Kip is the Lightbringer and is instructed to "save him or slay him and with him all the world."

The squad eventually escapes onto the Malargos ship after Kip marries Tisis, but Teia stays behind to further infiltrate the Broken Eye. the rest of the squad leaves with Kip to hunt the Color Prince.

With the White dead just before Sun Day, a new White is to be selected. Orea, the previous White, has maneuvered Karris into the selection process. Using intuition provided to her by Orholam, she divines that someone, presumably Andross, attempted to subvert the selection. After choosing the correct stone and surviving an immediate assassination attempt, she becomes the new White.

Dazen wakes up in the prison he had built for his brother. Apparently, the prisons Gavin escaped from have been rebuilt, as he is now in blue.

References

2014 American novels
American fantasy novels
Novels by Brent Weeks
Orbit Books books